The flag of the Ternopil region is an official symbol of the Ternopil region of Ukraine which follows the historical tradition of using regional symbols, an attribute of local governments and the executive branch.

The flag has a rectangular blue banner with an aspect ratio of 2:3, a yellow sword and a key placed in the middle, and three white towers with yellow accents above them.

History 
In December 2001, a rectangular banner with an aspect ratio of 2:3 was approved, which consisted of two horizontal stripes - yellow and blue in a ratio of 1:2. On the yellow strip - three white towers with open gates. In the blue stripe there was a yellow vertical sword with the hilt up and a horizontal yellow key.

After the remarks of the Ukrainian Heraldic Society regarding the coat of arms, the new decision on November 18, 2003 changed the flag of the region.

See also 

 Coat of arms of Ternopil Oblast
 Ternopil Oblast

Sources 

 Рішення Тернопільської обласної ради від 21 грудня 2001 року №317 Про герб і прапор Тернопільської області
 Рішення Тернопільської обласної ради від 18 листопада 2003 року №203 Про внесення часткових змін до герба і прапора Тернопільської області
 Рішення Тернопільської обласної ради від 15 березня 2014 року №1595 Про затвердження Положення і національно-визвольної символіки

Literature 

 Гречило, А. Сучасні символи областей України. — Київ, Львів, 2008. — С. 36-37.

External links 

 Українське геральдичне товариство
 Українська геральдика

Flags of Ukraine
Ternopil
Ternopil Oblast